Calocosmus marginipennis is a species of beetle in the family Cerambycidae. It was described by Gahan in 1889. It is known from Jamaica.

References

Calocosmus
Beetles described in 1889